The Phutthayotfa Chulalok-class frigates are two of forty-six s originally laid down for the United States Navy as ocean escorts (formerly called destroyer escorts), but were all redesignated as frigates on 30 June 1975, in the USN 1975 ship reclassification and their hull designation changed from DE to FF. The Thai Navy acquired them between 1994 and 1996.

Description 

As built, they were equipped with one /54 caliber Mark 42 gun forward, an eight-round ASROC launcher (with 16 missiles carried) abaft the gun and forward of the bridge, with four fixed  Mark 32 anti-submarine torpedo tubes. A helicopter deck and hangar for operating the DASH drone helicopter was fitted aft. The helicopter facilities were expanded in the 1970s to accommodate the larger, manned,  Kaman SH-2D Seasprite LAMP helicopter.

Service history 
Thailand had initially leased Truett in 1994. Following refits and a service life extensions costing some $14 million each, Ouellet and Truett were commissioned by the Royal Thai Navy as Phutthaloetla Naphalai (FFG-462)  and Phutthayotfa Chulalok (FFG-461). Both are still in active service.

In 2013, it was reported that the ships of this class would be retired, Phutthayotfa Chulalok in 2015, and Phutthaloetla Naphalai in 2017.

Ships of the class

Phutthayotfa Chulalok  

Phutthayotfa Chulalok. The ship is named after the first king of the Chakri Dynasty, King Phutthayotfa Chulaok the Great.

The Royal Thai Navy first leased the ship from the US Navy after she was decommissioned on 30 July 1994. The ship was eventually purchased on 9 December 1999.

Phutthaloetla Naphalai 

Phutthaloetla Naphalai . The ship is named after the second king of the Chakri Dynasty, King Phutthaloetla Naphalai

The Royal Thai Navy purchased the ship from the US Navy after she was decommissioned on 6 August 1993. The ship subsequently underwent a US $14M refit at the Cascade General Shipyard, Portland, Oregon, and arrived in Thailand in 1998.

References

Bibliography

Further reading

External links

Ships built in Bridge City, Louisiana
 
1970 ships
Royal Thai Navy ships
Frigate classes